Jean Pasquerel (c. 1400) was an Augustinian friar (member of the Order of St. Augustine),  almoner and confessor of Joan of Arc.

References

French Christians
Almoners